Tegostoma bipartalis is a moth in the family Crambidae. It was described by Walsingham & Hampson in 1896. It is found in Kenya, South Africa and Yemen.

References

Odontiini
Moths described in 1896
Moths of Africa
Moths of Asia
Taxa named by Thomas de Grey, 6th Baron Walsingham
Taxa named by George Hampson